Youngstown is an unincorporated community in southern Honey Creek Township, Vigo County, in the U.S. state of Indiana.

It is part of the Terre Haute metropolitan area.

History
Youngstown was subdivided and made a village on March 31, 1868, by Chauncey R. Carr. It was a station on the Evansville & Terre Haute Rail Road, about seven miles south of Terre Haute. George Planett built the first business house in 1868, when he was made the first postmaster. The post office ran until it was discontinued in 1912. In 1890 the population was approximately 39.

Geography

References

Unincorporated communities in Indiana
Unincorporated communities in Vigo County, Indiana
Terre Haute metropolitan area